Sanders Anne Laubenthal (December 25, 1943 – May 15, 2002) was an American poet, novelist, historian and textbook writer.

Life
Laubenthal served the United States Air Force from the time of the Vietnam War, starting writing OJT books for trainees in comic book style to train for lower level jobs such as dining hall cooks. She served as editor of many Air Force professional journals. Having reached the rank of Major in the Air Force, she retired, but continued to do research and write many reports/articles for the military. She had just finished her last military project and received payment for another reprint for Excalibur before she died from diabetic complications. Friends describe her as a quiet lady who was loyal and always creating.

Literary career
Much of Laubenthal's work concerns Mobile, Alabama, of which she was a native. She also wrote about the history of unrecorded areas of Scotland. She is best known, however, for one major work, the Arthurian fantasy Excalibur, first published in the Ballantine Adult Fantasy series in August 1973 and reprinted a number of times since.

Bibliography

Novels
The Last Confederate (1967)
Excalibur (1973)

Poetry
Songs of Mobile (1962)
The Gates of Wonder (1966)
Interlude and Other Poems (1969)

Nonfiction
A History of John Hay Air Base, Baguio City, Philippines (1981)

External links
The Excalibur Project - fansite for Sanders Anne Laubenthal's Excalibur.
Obituary

1943 births
2002 deaths
20th-century American novelists
20th-century American historians
American women novelists
Writers of modern Arthurian fiction
Deaths from diabetes
American fantasy writers
United States Air Force officers
20th-century American women writers
American women historians
American women poets
Women science fiction and fantasy writers
20th-century American poets